Jerzy Bińkowski (born 12 June 1959) is a Polish former basketball player. He competed in the men's tournament at the 1980 Summer Olympics.

References

1959 births
Living people
Polish men's basketball players
Olympic basketball players of Poland
Basketball players at the 1980 Summer Olympics
People from Zgorzelec
Sportspeople from Lower Silesian Voivodeship